The 2012–13 Chemnitzer FC season is the 47th season in the club's football history. In 2012–13 the club plays in the 3. Liga, the third tier of German football. It is the club's second season in this league, having been promoted from the Regionalliga in 2011. The club also took part in the 2012–13 edition of the DFB-Pokal, but was knocked out in the first round by 2. Bundesliga side Dynamo Dresden. Chemnitzer FC also took part in the 2012–13 edition of the Saxony Cup, having received a bye for the first two rounds.

Review and events

Matches

Legend

3. Liga

League fixtures and results

Table

League table

Table summary

DFB-Pokal

Squad information

Squad and statistics

|}

Transfers

In

Out

Notes
1.Chemnitzer FC goals listed first.

Sources

Match reports

Other sources

External links
 2012–13 Chemnitzer FC season at Weltfussball.de 
 2012–13 Chemnitzer FC season at kicker.de 
 2012–13 Chemnitzer FC season at Fussballdaten.de 

Chemnitzer FC
Chemnitzer FC seasons